Forfeit or forfeiture may refer to:

Arts, entertainment, and media 
 Forfeit, a 2007 thriller film starring Billy Burke
 "Forfeit", a song by Chevelle from Wonder What's Next
 Forfeit/Fortune, a 2008 album by Crooked Fingers

Law 
 Asset forfeiture, in law, the confiscation of assets related to a crime
 Forfeiture (law), deprivation or destruction of a right in consequence of not performing an obligation or condition

Sports 
 Forfeit (sport), a premature end of a game
 Forfeit (baseball)
 Forfeit (chess), defeat in a chess game by a player's being absent or out of time
 Declaration and forfeiture, in cricket, two possible ends of an innings

See also 
 Forfaiting, a financial term
 Walkover, when a contestant is awarded victory because there are no other contestants